Video Concert Hall (VCH) was launched in 1978 or 1979  on the USA Network and on Showtime, featuring an unhosted rotation of music videos. Often credited as being the precursor to MTV, Video Concert Hall was reportedly the most popular programming on QUBE, a cable television unit of Warner Communications.  VCH, as it was often called, was created by radio and cable television executive Lloyd G. Crowe (Jerry Crowe) and Charles W. Henderson, a journalist who would later work for TriStar Pictures. Video Concert Hall was produced by Henderson-Crowe Productions and the company Video Concert Hall, Ltd. at studios in Atlanta, Georgia. Crowe and Henderson served as executive producers of Video Concert Hall, as well as other top-rated syndicated musical variety TV specials.

Billboard, the American magazine covering the music industry, said in a cover story that Video Concert Hall was the first-ever nationwide video music programming on cable television predating MTV by almost three years. Video Concert Hall creators Charles Henderson and Jerry Crowe are considered the "fathers" of television's music video programming.

Video Concert Hall ran daily on USA Network from 1978 to 1981 on a seemingly arbitrary schedule, appearing on early morning, daytime, late night, and early evening timeslots alike for durations ranging from one to four hours.  Video Concert Hall was also carried on Showtime, the Satellite Program Network - SPN, and was seen worldwide on AFRTS (the Armed Forces Network) and frequently as video entertainment on commercial airline flights.

Video Concert Hall was also among the first advertising supported cable TV networks. Video Concert Hall was cited as among cable's 15 leading for-profit services in Fortune magazine's 1981 Fortune 500 issue.

The theme music for Video Concert Hall was the first thirty seconds of "Carouselambra" by Led Zeppelin.

Specific to no particular pop music genre, Video Concert Hall featured new wave music, punk rock, disco, funk, soul, and album-oriented rock.

Particularly important about Video Concert Hall is not only to note its historical significance in the evolution of music video television programming, but that it is also where artists such as The Police (with Sting), Split Enz, and Gary Numan were first introduced to the American audience en masse.

Notable artists 
Among the artists who appeared on VCH are:
 The A's
 ABBA
 Atlanta Rhythm Section
 Blondie
 The Buggles
 Cameo
 Chaka Khan
 David Bowie
 Alicia Bridges
 Herman Brood
 Chic
 Tim Curry
 Roger Daltrey
 Devo
 The Dickies
 Dire Straits
 Falco
 Genesis
 Gerry Rafferty
 Iggy Pop
 Joan Armatrading
 M (band)
 Madness
 Nazareth
 Gary Numan
 Pat Benatar
 Parliament Funkadelic
 The Police
 Rose Royce
 Shooting Star
 Sister Sledge
 Spider
 Split Enz
 Stephanie Mills
 The Cramps
 The Ozark Mountain Daredevils
 The Sports
 Squeeze
 Styx
 Donna Summer
 Supertramp
 A Taste of Honey
 Pete Townshend
 Village People
 The Who
 Ziggurat

Notable videos 
 Alicia Bridges "I Love The Nightlife"
 Atlanta Rhythm Section "Spooky (live)"
 Blondie "Rapture"
 Brothers Johnson "Stomp"
 Captain & Tennille "Do That to Me One More Time"
 Chaka Khan "Do You Love What You Feel"
 Cher "Hell on Wheels"
 Chic "Le Freak"
 David Bowie "Ashes to Ashes"
 David Bowie "DJ"
 David Bowie "Fashion"
 David Bowie "Heroes"
 David London "Samantha"
 Devo "Whip It"
 Dire Straits "Sultans of Swing"
 Falco "Der Kommissar"
 Gary Numan "Cars"
 Gary Numan "Down in the Park"
 Gerry Rafferty "Baker Street"
 Grace Slick "Dreams"
 Herb Alpert "Rise"
 Herb Alpert "Rotation"
 Herman Brood "Saturday Night"
 Iggy Pop "Five Foot One"
 Iggy Pop "I'm Bored"
 Journey
 Kansas "Dust in the Wind"
 M (band) "Pop Muzik"
 Madness "One Step Beyond"
 Nazareth "Holiday"
 Pete Townshend "A Little is Enough"
 Pete Townshend "Let My Love Open the Door"
 Pete Townshend "Rough Boys"
 Rick James "Super Freak"
 Rita Coolidge "Let's Go Dancing"
 Roger Daltrey "Free Me"
 Rose Royce "Car Wash"
 Rufus and Chaka Khan "Do You Love What You Feel"
 Shooting Star "You've Got What I Need"
 Shooting Star "Tonight"
 Sniff 'n' the Tears "Driver's Seat"
 Split Enz "I Got You"
 Split Enz "I Hope I Never"
 Split Enz "One Step Ahead"
 Squeeze "Another Nail in My Heart"
 Squeeze "Cool For Cats"
 Squeeze "Tempted"
 Stephanie Mills "Never Knew Love Like This Before"
 Styx "Babe"
 Styx "Borrowed Time"
 Supertramp "Breakfast In America"
 Supertramp "Goodbye Stranger"
 Supertramp "Take The Long Way Home"
 Supertramp "The Logical Song"
 The A's "Who's Gonna Save the World?"
 The Buggles "Video Killed The Radio Star"
 The Cramps "Garbage Man"
 The Dickies "Nights in White Satin"
 The Headboys "The Shape of Things to Come"
 The Police "Bring on the Night"
 The Police "Don't Stand So Close To Me"
 The Police "I Can't Stand Losing You"
 The Police "Message in a Bottle"
 The Police "Roxanne"
 The Sports "Don't Throw Stones"
 The Sports "Who Listens To The Radio?"
 The Who "Baba O'Riley (live)"
 The Who "Who Are You?"
 Tim Curry "I Do The Rock"
 Tim Curry "Paradise Garage"
 Tom Petty and the Heartbreakers "Here Comes My Girl"
 Tom Petty and the Heartbreakers "Refugee"
 Village People "Ready for the '80s"
 Village People "Sleazy"

References

External links
 
 Video Concert Hall - A Tribute Site A collection of the videos featured on Video Concert Hall, and a place for fans of the show to share their memories.

USA Network original programming
1978 American television series debuts
1981 American television series endings
1970s American music television series
Defunct music video networks
Television channels and stations established in 1979
1984 American television series endings
1980s American music television series
Showtime (TV network) original programming